Wyoming Highway 335 (WYO 335) is a  roughly north-south Wyoming State Road located in central Sheridan County south of the city of Sheridan.

Route description
Wyoming Highway 335 begins its southern end at Sheridan County Route 26 (Red Grade Road) near the Bighorn National Forest and southwest of the unincorporated community and census-designated place (CDP) of Big Horn. Highway 335 heads east for just over 3 miles before turning due north for another 2.4 miles where WYO 335 has an intersection with Sheridan County Route 87 (Beaver Creek Road) as it curves back east to serve the community of Big Horn. After passing through Big Horn WYO 335 turns, again back north toward Sheridan as it passes the Powder Horn Golf Club. One last time, 335 gently curves northeast and ends at U.S. Route 87 and the southern terminus of Wyoming Highway 332 (Big Horn Avenue) after 9.71 miles south of Sheridan.

Major intersections

See also

 List of state highways in Wyoming
 List of highways numbered 335\

References

External links 

 Wyoming State Routes 300-399

Transportation in Sheridan County, Wyoming
335